The MTV Video Music Award for Best Video from a Film was first awarded in 1987, recognizing the best videos whose songs were a part of a movie soundtrack or featured in a film. As time went on, though, music videos taken from movie soundtracks became more rare, and so the last of this award was given out in 2003. No artist has ever won this award more than once, though Madonna, Will Smith, and U2 are all winners who have been nominated a record three times for this award. U2 members Adam Clayton and Larry Mullen, Jr., however, are technically the most nominated artists of this category, for along with their three nominations with U2, they also received a nomination for their video for the Mission: Impossible theme.  In a similar vein, Singles and Batman Forever are the two most nominated films of this category, as they each had two videos off of their soundtracks receive nominations on their respective years.

Recipients

MTV Video Music Awards
Film awards for Best Song
Awards established in 1987
Awards disestablished in 2003